"Singles You Up" is a song co-written and recorded by American country pop singer Jordan Davis. It was released in June 2017 as his debut single and the lead single from his debut album, Home State. A stripped version and Ryan Riback remix were released in 2018.

Content
The song is about a man attempting to woo a woman who is currently with another man. He states that he will be present if her man ever "singles [her] up", or leaves her. Davis wrote the song with Steven Dale Jones and Justin Ebach. Davis said that "When we finally honed in on the way we ended up approaching it, it was this guy having to wait his turn, seeing this girl with somebody else. He has feelings for her and hopes the other guy screws it up somehow. Once we honed in on that, we wrote it really quick."

Critical reception
Mike Thiel of Taste of Country reviewed the song with favor, praising the use of internal rhyme and calling it an "easygoing singalong".

Commercial performance
The song reached No. 1 on Country Airplay, and No. 4 on Hot Country Songs for charts dated April 21, 2018. It has sold 237,000 copies in the United States as of June 2018.

Music video
The music video was directed by Eric Ryan Anderson and premiered on CMT, GAC and Vevo in February 2018. It was filmed in the deserts of El Paso, TX. It revolves around a storyline of Jordan "stealing" his love interest from another man and taking her away in a vintage Pontiac Firebird, and recording the adventure on his iPhone.

Track listings

Chart performance

Weekly charts

Year-end charts

Certifications

References

2017 debut singles
2017 songs
Jordan Davis (singer) songs
MCA Nashville Records singles
Songs written by Jordan Davis (singer)
Songs written by Justin Ebach
Songs written by Steven Dale Jones